Schistura caudofurca is a species of ray-finned fish in the stone loach genus Schistura. It occurs in the Red River system of southern China and northern Viet Nam, and also the Nam Mat, Nam Xam and Nam Ma river systems in Laos. It prefers streams with a moderate to fast flow and gravel or rock substrates.

References 

caudofurca
Fish described in 1978